The 2004 Maldives FA Cup, was the 17th edition of the Maldives FA Cup.

Qualifying rounds

First round

Second round

Third Round

Quarter-finals

Semi-finals

Third place play-off

Final

References

 Maldives FA Cup 2004 at rsssf.com

External links
 Maldives FA Cup Official page at Facebook

Maldives FA Cup seasons
FA Cup